Seychelles elects on national level a head of state—the president—and a legislature. The president is elected for a five-year term by the people. The National Assembly/Assemblée Nationale has 34 members elected for terms of five years, 25 members elected in single-seat constituencies and 9 members elected by proportional representation. Seychelles has a two-party system, which means that there are two dominant political parties, with extreme difficulty for anyone to achieve electoral success under the banner of any other party.

Latest elections

Presidential elections

Parliamentary elections

See also
Electoral calendar
Electoral system

External links
Adam Carr's Election Archive
African Elections Database